Peski is a rural locality in Naumovsky Selsoviet Rural Settlement, Konyshyovsky District, Kursk Oblast, Russia. Population:

Geography 
The village is located on the Belichka River (a left tributary of the Svapa River), 48 km from the Russia–Ukraine border, 84 km north-west of Kursk, 25 km north-west of the district center – the urban-type settlement Konyshyovka, 11 km from the selsoviet center – Naumovka.

 Climate
Peski has a warm-summer humid continental climate (Dfb in the Köppen climate classification).

Transport 
Peski is located 39 km from the federal route  Ukraine Highway, 54 km from the route  Crimea Highway, 15 km from the route  (Trosna – M3 highway), 2 km from the road of regional importance  (Dmitriyev – Beryoza – Menshikovo – Khomutovka), 3.5 km from the road of intermunicipal significance  (Makaro-Petrovskoye – Belye Berega), 5 km from the nearest railway station Arbuzovo (railway lines Navlya – Lgov-Kiyevsky and Arbuzovo – Luzhki-Orlovskiye).

The rural locality is situated 90 km from Kursk Vostochny Airport, 184 km from Belgorod International Airport and 288 km from Voronezh Peter the Great Airport.

References

Notes

Sources

Rural localities in Konyshyovsky District